The Aboriginal Healing Foundation was established in 1998 as an Indigenous managed, non-profit corporation dedicated to responding to the legacy of residential schools in Canada and the associated community health impacts.  Funding for the Aboriginal Healing Foundation ceased in 2014.

History 
The Aboriginal Healing Foundation was created on March 30, 1998.  It was established following consultations with residential school survivors, the Assembly of First Nations, the Inuit Tapirisat of Canada, the Congress of Aboriginal Peoples, the Métis National Council, and the Native Women's Association of Canada. The mission of the Aboriginal Healing Foundation was to foster sustainable healing strategies in Indigenous communities in Canada that begin to address the impacts of the residential school system.  The Foundation was initially provided with $350 million of funding from the Canadian government to carry out this work with residential school survivors and Indigenous communities across Canada.  The Foundation was designed as an organization to be responsible for the management of the Canada government's healing strategy related to residential schools. This strategy was part of the "Gathering Strength, Canada's Aboriginal Action Plan" established by the federal government on January 7, 1998.  The original mandate of the Foundation was set to end on March 31, 2009.

The first chair of the Foundation was Georges Erasmus.  The original board of directors was composed of 17 people, including Garnet Angeconeb, Charlene Belleau, Jerome Berthelette, Paul Chartrand, Angus Cockney, Ken Courchene, Wendy John, Richard Kistabish, Cerrielynn Lamouche, Ann Meekitjuk-Hanson, Teressa Nahanee, Dorris Peters, Viola Robinson, Grant Severight, Cindy Swanson, and Charles Weaselhead.

In 2005 the Aboriginal Healing Foundation was granted an additional $40 million through the 2005 federal budget.

The Indian Residential Schools Settlement Agreement of 2007 resulted in an additional $125 million of funding for the Healing Foundation and a prolonged mandate for the organization. Part of this funding was through the federal government.  Additionally under the settlement agreement the 50 Roman Catholic Church entities associated with the settlement agreement were required to pay $29 million to the Aboriginal Healing Foundation which would be used for community healing programs. There has been debate about the Church's obligations to pay this amount and in 2013 the Canadian government pursued legal action for $1.6 million that the Catholic entities had not paid the Foundation.

Throughout its operation the Foundation received $515 million from the Government of Canada. The Foundation also generated $537,146,681 in interest on this funding which was further used to fund community projects.  In 2010 funding for the Aboriginal Healing Foundation was cut by Stephen Harper's conservative government.  This cut in funding resulted in the closure of the Foundation in 2014.  It also resulted in the discontinuation of funding to many community based healing initiatives and the closure of many healing programs regionally in Canada.  Following the closure of the Aboriginal Healing Foundation its research library, records, and archives were donated to the Shingwauk Residential Schools Centre at Algoma University.

Funded Community Projects 
The first funding cycle of the Foundation operated in the form of a call for proposals that was sent out on December 3, 1998.  The call was open to communities and survivor groups and focused on three thematic areas of programming: 1) Developing and Enhancing Aboriginal Capacity and Community Therapeutic Healing; 2) Healing Centers; 3) Restoring Balance, Honour, and History.  This first batch of funding resulted in $19.4 million being awarded to projects across Canada.  Funded community groups included:

Funding Evaluation 
During its operation the Aboriginal Healing Foundation funded over 1,500 community based healing initiatives.  The Foundation was subject to government funding audits and the Foundation also conducted community based program evaluations of the initiatives which received funding.  The 2009 Indian and Northern Affairs Canada (INAC) evaluation of the Foundation programming reviewed the administration files of Foundation funded projects; conducted staff and subject expert interviews; and conducted community case studies which included interviews with healing project participants.  The evaluation found the Foundation had been very successful in administering funding and contributing to community healing but that there was still much ongoing work in communities to be done.  INAC also indicated that there was a strong need for community based healing initiatives to continue and recommended continued funding of the Foundation.

Research Mandate 
In addition to funding community based healing initiatives the Aboriginal Healing Foundation had a research mandate that was dedicated to creating a knowledge base relating to the long term community and health impacts of residential schools.  This research mandate was outlined in the 1998 agreement that the Foundation signed with the Government of Canada and resulted in the Foundation seeking out researchers, scholars, and authors to write publications on residential schools, reconciliation, health, and other issues.

The first research director of the Aboriginal Healing Foundation was Gail Guthrie Valaskakis (2000-2007).  Following the death of Valaskakis in 2007, Jonathan Dewar served as research director from 2007 to 2012.  As a result of the work of research branch of the organization published numerous books, including:
 
 
 
 
 
 
 
 
 
 
 
 
 
 
 
 
 
 
 
 
 
 
 
 
In addition to the publication of books the Aboriginal Healing Foundation maintained a research library.  Named after the first research director the Aboriginal Healing Foundation, the Gail Guthrie Valaskakis Memorial Resource Library is a special collections library focused on residential schools, healing, reconciliation, and Indigenous people.  The library contains over 6,000 unique items including video, books, research materials, and project reports.  The contents of the library was donated to the Shingwauk Residential Schools Centre in 2011 following the announcement of funding cuts to the Foundation.

See also 
 Canadian Indian residential school system
 Truth and Reconciliation Commission (Canada)
 First Nations

References

External links 
 Aboriginal Healing Foundation website
 Aboriginal Healing Foundation fonds

Indigenous health in Canada
Indigenous organizations in Canada
Residential schools in Canada
Assimilation of indigenous peoples of North America
1998 establishments in Canada
2014 disestablishments in Canada